Jecin George is an Indian film score composer. He started off as assistant of Deepak Dev, Rahul Raj and Gopi Sunder.

References 

Living people
Malayalam film score composers
Year of birth missing (living people)